Kuhak-e Do (also Romanized as Kūhak-e Do; also known as Kūhak-e Pā’īn) is a village in Band-e Amir Rural District, Zarqan District, Shiraz County, Fars Province, Iran. At the 2006 census, its population was 106, in 28 families.

References 

Populated places in Zarqan County